Joseph Chukwudi Obidiaso   (born 20 September  1992 in Orlu, Imo State) is a Nigerian professional footballer centre forward or Winger, who currently plays for Al Tayaran Benina  in the Libya first Division.

Career
Obidiaso started his career in Nigeria 2004-2006, at Chedeks and moved to Ambek FC. In January 2010 he transferred to Olimpia Bălți, where he signed a 2 year-contract. He then moved back to Nigeria and finalized a short term deal at Ambek Football Club.

Obidiaso was signed by Iraqi Premier League club Kufa FC in 2014.

References

External links
 Profile at KTFF.org
 http://www.sporyeni.com/bafin-tercihi-nijeryalilar-3223h.htm
 http://www.haberalkibrisli.net/spor/gg-istedigini-aldi-0-1-h48736.html

1992 births
Living people
Nigerian footballers
CSF Bălți players
Tuwaiq Club players
Saudi Second Division players
Nigerian expatriate footballers
Expatriate footballers in Moldova
Nigerian expatriate sportspeople in Moldova
Expatriate footballers in Northern Cyprus
Nigerian expatriate sportspeople in Northern Cyprus
Expatriate footballers in Iraq
Nigerian expatriate sportspeople in Iraq
Expatriate footballers in Saudi Arabia
Nigerian expatriate sportspeople in Saudi Arabia
Association football forwards
Sportspeople from Imo State